Yokuşlu may refer to:

 Yokuşlu, Dicle
 Yokuşlu, Yusufeli, a village in Artvin Province, Turkey
 Okay Yokuşlu (born 1994), Turkish professional footballer